Affect theory is a theory that seeks to organize affects, sometimes used interchangeably with emotions or subjectively experienced feelings, into discrete categories and to typify their physiological, social, interpersonal, and internalized manifestations. The conversation about affect theory has been taken up in psychology, psychoanalysis, neuroscience, medicine, interpersonal communication, literary theory, critical theory, media studies, and gender studies, among other fields. Hence, affect theory is defined in different ways, depending on the discipline.

Affect theory is originally attributed to the psychologist Silvan Tomkins, introduced in the first two volumes of his book Affect Imagery Consciousness (1962). Tomkins uses the concept of affect to refer to the "biological portion of emotion," defined as the "hard-wired, preprogrammed, genetically transmitted mechanisms that exist in each of us," which, when triggered, precipitate a "known pattern of biological events". However, it is also acknowledged that, in adults, the affective experience is a result of interactions between the innate mechanism and a "complex matrix of nested and interacting ideo-affective formations."

Affect theory in psychology

Silvan Tomkins's nine affects 

According to the psychologist Silvan Tomkins, there are nine primary affects. Tomkins characterized affects by low/high intensity labels and by their physiological expression:

Positive:
 Enjoyment/Joy (reaction to success/impulse to share) – smiling, lips wide and out
 Interest/Excitement (reaction to new situation/impulse to attend) – eyebrows down, eyes tracking, eyes looking, closer listening

Neutral:
 Surprise/Startle (reaction to sudden change/resets impulses) – eyebrows up, eyes blinking

Negative:
 Anger/Rage (reaction to threat/impulse to attack) – frowning, a clenched jaw, a red face
 Disgust (reaction to bad taste/impulse to discard) – the lower lip raised and protruded, head forward and down
 Dissmell (reaction to bad smell/impulse to avoid – similar to distaste) – upper lip raised, head pulled back
 Distress/Anguish (reaction to loss/impulse to mourn) – crying, rhythmic sobbing, arched eyebrows, mouth lowered
 Fear/Terror (reaction to danger/impulse to run or hide) – a frozen stare, a pale face, coldness, sweat, erect hair
 Shame/Humiliation (reaction to failure/impulse to review behaviour) – eyes lowered, the head down and averted, blushing

Prescriptive applications
According to Tomkins, optimal mental health involves maximizing positive affects and minimizing negative affects. Affect should also be properly expressed so to make the identification of affect possible to others.

Affect theory is also used prescriptively in investigations about intimacy and intimate relationships. Kelly describes relationships as agreements to work collaboratively toward maximizing positive affect and minimizing negative affect. Like the "optimal mental health" blueprint, this blueprint requires that members of the relationship express affect to one another in order to identify progress.

These blueprints can also describe natural and implicit goals. For example, Donald Nathanson uses the "affect" to create a narrative for one of his patients:

I suspect that the reason he refuses to watch movies is the sturdy fear of enmeshment in the affect depicted on the screen; the affect mutualization for which most of us frequent the movie theater is only another source of discomfort for him. ... His refusal to risk the range of positive and negative affect associated with sexuality robs any possible relationship of one of its best opportunities to work on the first two rules of either the Kelly or the Tomkins blueprint. Thus, his problems with intimacy may be understood in one aspect as an overly substantial empathic wall, and in another aspect as a purely internal problem with the expression and management of his own affect.

Tomkins claims that "Christianity became a powerful universal religion in part because of its more general solution to the problem of anger, violence, and suffering versus love, enjoyment, and peace.".

Affect theory is also referenced heavily in Tomkins's script theory.

Attempts to typify affects in psychology
Humor is a subject of debate in affect theory. In studies of humor's physiological manifestations, humor provokes highly characteristic facial expressions. Some research has shown evidence that humor may be a response to a conflict between negative and positive affects,  such as fear and enjoyment, which results in spasmodic contractions of parts of the body, mainly in the stomach and diaphragm area, as well as contractions in the upper cheek muscles. Further affects that seem to be missing for Tomkins's taxonomy include relief, resignation, and confusion, among many others.

The affect joy is observed through the display of smiling. These affects can be identified through immediate facial reactions that people have to a stimulus, typically well before they could process any real response to the stimulus.

The findings from a study on negative affect arousal and white noise by Stanley S. Seidner "support the existence of a negative affect arousal mechanism through observations regarding the devaluation of speakers from other Spanish ethnic origins".

Critical theory

Affect theory is explored in philosophy, psychoanalytic theory, gender studies, and art theory. Eve Sedgwick and Lauren Berlant have been called "affect theorists" who write from critical theory perspectives. Many other critical theorists have relied heavily on affect theory, including Elizabeth Povinelli. Affect theory is drawn from by Marxist autonomists including Franco Berardi, Michael Hardt and Antonio Negri. And by Marxist feminists including Selma James and Silvia Federici, who consider the cognitive and material manifestations of particularized gendered, performed roles including caregiving. Critical theorist Sara Ahmed describes affect as "sticky" in her essay "Happy Objects" to explain the sustained connection between "ideas, values, and objects.". 
In line with these theorists, many scholars identify the role of affect in shaping social values, gender ideals, and collective groups. Affect is seen as instrumental for events and symbols that produce shared identities, and is therefore central in contemporary politics. Affect is also treated as central in capitalist systems, including people's attachment to commodities and "dreams" of class mobility. In addition, the non-discursive and non-deliberative attributes of affect may produce social interactions and experiences that are non-reducible to specific endpoints, and at times may allow people to experience new modes of existence separated from their main life goals.

Interpersonal communication 
This nonverbal mode of conveying feelings and influence is held to play a central role in intimate relationships. The Emotional Safety model of couples therapy seeks to identify the affective messages that occur within the couple's emotional relationship (the partners' feelings about themselves, each other, and their relationship); most importantly, messages regarding (a) the security of the attachment and (b) how each individual is valued.

One practical application of affect theory has been its incorporation into couples therapy. Two characteristics of affects have powerful implications for intimate relationships:

According to Tomkins, a central characteristic of affects is affective resonance, which refers to a person's tendency to resonate and experience the same affect in response to viewing a display of that affect by another person, sometimes thought to be "contagion". Affective resonance is considered to be the original basis for all human communication (before there were words, there was a smile and a nod).
Also according to Tomkins, affects provide a sense of urgency to the less powerful drives. Thus, affects are powerful sources of motivation. In Tomkins' words, affects make good things better and bad things worse.

Criticism 
Some scholars have taken issue with the claims and methodologies of affect theorists. Ruth Leys has objected to affect theory's implications for artistic and literary criticism, as well as to its appropriation in some forms of trauma theory.
Aubrey Anable has also criticised affect theory for its imprecision, claiming that its "language of intensity, becoming, and in-betweenness and its emphasis on the unpresentable give it a maddening incoherence, or shade too easily into purely subjective responses to the world". Jason Josephson Storm, a professor of religious studies, argued that affect theory in the humanities has failed to distinguish itself from poststructuralism and ignores empirical evidence that affects are culturally constructed.

See also 

 Selective exposure theory
 Mood management theory
 Affect consciousness

References

External links
 Tomkins Institute

Psychoanalytic theory
Spinozism
Neo-Spinozism